Year 1341 (MCCCXLI) was a common year starting on Monday (link will display the full calendar) of the Julian calendar.

Events 
 January 1 – An earthquake with a magnitude of 6.0 and a maximum Mercalli intensity of VIII (Severe) affects Crimea.
 January 18 – The Queen's College, a constituent college of the University of Oxford in England, is founded.
 April 8 – Petrarch is crowned poet laureate in Rome, the first man since antiquity to be given this honor. 
 September – October: The Byzantine civil war of 1341–1347 (between John VI Kantakouzenos and the regency for the infant John V Palaiologos) breaks out.

 Date unknown 
 The Breton War of Succession begins, over the control of the Duchy of Brittany.
 Margarete Maultasch, Countess of Tyrol, expels her husband John Henry of Bohemia, to whom she had been married as a child. She subsequently marries Louis of Bavaria without having been divorced, which results in the excommunication of the couple.
 Tbilisi becomes a capital of European Christian Cathedra, after the city of Smirna. George V (the Brilliant) returns Jerusalem and the Grave of Christ from the Muslims.
 Saluzzo is sacked by Manfred V of Saluzzo.
 Casimir III of Poland builds a masonry castle in Lublin, and encircles the city with defensive walls.
 The sultan of Delhi Muhammad bin Tughluq chooses Ibn Battuta to lead a diplomatic mission to Yuan Dynasty China.
 A great flood in the river Periyar in modern-day southern India leads to the river changing its course, the closing of Muziris, the opening up of Cochin (Kochi) harbour, submersion of some islands, and birth of some new islands.
 Chinese poet Zhang Xian writes the Iron Cannon Affair, about the destructive use of gunpowder and the cannon.
 Approximate date – Magnus Erikssons landslag (the Country Law of Magnus IV of Sweden) is promulgated.

Births 
 June 5 – Edmund of Langley, son of King Edward III of England (d. 1402)
 September 1 – Frederick III the Simple, King of Sicily (d. 1377)
 November 10 – Henry Percy, 1st Earl of Northumberland, English statesman (d. 1408)
 date unknown
 Bonne of Bourbon, Countess regent of Savoy (d. 1402)
 Hermann II, Landgrave of Hesse (d. 1413)
 Louis, Duke of Durazzo (d. 1376)
 Qu You, Chinese novelist (d. 1427)

Deaths 
 January 22 – Louis I, Duke of Bourbon (b. 1279)
 March 2 or October 3 – Martha of Denmark, queen consort of Sweden (b. 1277)
 April 30 – John III, Duke of Brittany (b. 1286)
 June – Al-Nasir Muhammad, Sultan of Egypt (b. 1295)
 June 19 – Juliana Falconieri, Italian saint (b. 1270)
 June 15 – Andronikos III Palaiologos, Byzantine Emperor (b. 1297)
 August 9 – Eleanor of Anjou, queen consort of Sicily (b. 1289)
 August 28 – King Levon IV of Armenia (murdered) (b. 1309)
 December – Gediminas, Duke of Lithuania
 December 4 – Janisław I, Archbishop of Gniezno  
 date unknown
 Petrus Filipsson, Archbishop of Uppsala
 Uzbeg Khan, Khan of the Golden Horde (b. 1282)
 Nicholas I Sanudo, Duke of the Archipelago
 Bartholomew II Ghisi, Lord of Tenos and Mykonos, Triarch of Negroponte
 probable – Richard Folville, English outlaw and parson (resisting arrest)

References